The 1936 Italian Grand Prix was a Grand Prix motor race held at Monza on 13 September 1936. The 72 lap event was won by Bernd Rosemeyer.

Classification

References

Italian Grand Prix
Italian Grand Prix
Grand Prix